The OVW Light Heavyweight Championship was a title contested in Ohio Valley Wrestling (OVW). The title was created on February 9, 1999 and was retired on March 1, 2001 due to the company withdrawing its membership from the NWA in 2000 and becoming one of the first developmental territory's for World Wrestling Federation (now WWE). The title was declared retired, meaning that the OVW Light Heavyweight Championship is now being represented by a trash can. The final champion was Chris Micheals, who defeated the former champion Sean Casey at the OVW TV Tapings to win the title.

Title history

List of combined reigns

External links
 Title History at solie.org
 Title History at Online World of Wrestling

Ohio Valley Wrestling championships
Light heavyweight wrestling championships
Defunct sports competitions
Recurring sporting events established in 1999
Recurring sporting events disestablished in 2001
1999 establishments in Kentucky
2001 disestablishments in Kentucky